Manuela Lutze (born 20 March 1974 in Blankenburg am Harz, East Germany) is a multi Olympic-medaling sculler who competed in four Olympics, winning two gold medals and a bronze medal. In addition, she has also won 5 Gold Medals in the Quadruple Sculls event at the World Championships, beginning with Lac d'Aiguebelette, France in 1997.

References 
 Athlete bio at 2008 Olympics site

Living people
1974 births
Olympic rowers of Germany
German female rowers
Rowers at the 1996 Summer Olympics
Rowers at the 2000 Summer Olympics
Rowers at the 2004 Summer Olympics
Rowers at the 2008 Summer Olympics
Olympic gold medalists for Germany
Olympic bronze medalists for Germany
People from Blankenburg (Harz)
Olympic medalists in rowing
Medalists at the 2008 Summer Olympics
World Rowing Championships medalists for Germany
Medalists at the 2004 Summer Olympics
Medalists at the 2000 Summer Olympics
Sportspeople from Saxony-Anhalt
20th-century German women
21st-century German women